Thomas Family Grave is a heritage-listed grave at 79 Callan Avenue, Maryland, City of Newcastle, New South Wales, Australia. The property is owned by Newcastle City Council. It was added to the New South Wales State Heritage Register on 2 April 1999.

Description 

The grave is a burial marker of the Thomas family, early colonial settlers descended from John Thomas, who received the first land grant in the area in 1835.

It is a two-metre white marble obelisk with scrolls on a sandstone base, dated 1904. It is enclosed in a low cast-iron fence, surrounded by a wooden picket fence.

Heritage listing 
The Thomas Family Grave was listed on the New South Wales State Heritage Register on 2 April 1999.

See also

References

Attribution 

New South Wales State Heritage Register
Burials in New South Wales
Articles incorporating text from the New South Wales State Heritage Register